The Roman Catholic Diocese of Lafia is a diocese located in the city of Lafia in the Ecclesiastical province of Abuja in Nigeria.

History
 December 5, 2000: Established as Diocese of Lafia from the Metropolitan Archdiocese of Jos and the Diocese of Makurdi

Special churches
The Cathedral is  St. William's Cathedral in Lafia.

Leadership
 Bishops of Lafia (Roman rite)
 Bishop Matthew Ishaya Audu (December 5, 2000 - January 6, 2020), appointed Archbishop of Jos
 Bishop David Ajang (March 31, 2021 - present)

See also
Roman Catholicism in Nigeria

Sources
 GCatholic.org Information
 Catholic Hierarchy

Roman Catholic dioceses in Nigeria
Christian organizations established in 2000
Roman Catholic dioceses and prelatures established in the 20th century
Roman Catholic Ecclesiastical Province of Abuja